Love.Live.Life is the third studio album released by English hip-hop trio N-Dubz, released on 29 November 2010, as a collaboration by All Around the World and Island Records. Following the release of the album the group announced a hiatus to focus on all three individual solo projects.

Background

The group began recording the album following the success of Against All Odds. Following the success of the group's MOBO Award-winning single "Playing with Fire", the group announced that they would be embarking on a trip to the United States in an attempt to secure a record deal for themselves there. The group, however, were banned from travelling to the country because of visa issues which were later resolved in early February. Former Island Def Jam boss L.A. Reid, a big N-Dubz fan, then arranged a meeting with the group with the intention of signing the trio to his label. In May 2010, it was announced that the group had secured a five-album recording deal with Island Records. The group recorded the album with American producers Salaam Remi, Jean Baptiste Kouame and Jim Jonsin on the album. The making of the album was released on DVD.

Singles
"We Dance On" was released on 20 May 2010 as the album's lead single. It peaked at #5 on the UK Singles Chart. The song was also included on the soundtrack to the film Streetdance 3D. "Best Behaviour" was released on 17 October 2010 as the second single from the album. It peaked at 10 in both the UK and Scotland, and became a top 40 hit in Ireland. The song also appears on Skepta's album Doin' It Again. "Girls" was released as the album's third single on 12 December 2010. It peaked at 19 on the UK Singles Chart. A fourth track from the album, "So Alive" was released as single on 6 February 2011. The album's fifth and final single, "Morning Star" was released on 14 March.

Promotional music videos
Music videos for "Took It All Away" and "Cold Shoulder" were recorded and released in promotion of the album. "Took It All Away" features clips from the video game LittleBigPlanet. "Cold Shoulder" features footage of the Love.Live.Life tour.

Critical reception

The album has received mixed reviews from contemporary music critics. Gavin Martin of the Daily Mirror gave the album a three star rating, deeming it upbeat and boisterous. Martin felt that "[the album's] quality wavers but Transatlantic studio muscle and tracks like 'Toot It and Boot It' may see an advance on [N-Dubz's] U.S. ambitions." Andy Gill of The Independent deemed the album as "a fairly predictable fare", highlighting "So Alive" as its best track: "The best piece on here is 'So Alive,' blessed with bullient bonhomie which despite the lingering attitude, proves engagingly infectious." Fraser McAlpine from NME said of the album: "What N-Dubz try to express as anthemic wisdom always seems to come out braggier and shoutier than they mean to." Killian Fox of The Observer felt that for all the album's dynamism, it feels like a formula-driven move, and its insistence on having fun wears thin. While Fiona Sheperd of The Scotsman said that Love.Live.Life oscillates between processed mulch such as "Love Sick" and more successful grime crossover tracks like "So Alive". Sheperd further deemed the album as "still just kids' stuff."

Track listing

Additional credits
Management by Jonathan Shalit and Rich Castillo for ROAR Global, London
Represented by Rich Castillo; assisted by Dean Ondrus Coulson for ROAR 2wo7even
A&R for IDJ – Max Gousse
Live guitars by Martin Anderson
Design and artwork by enjine

Love.Live.Life.Tour

Tour dates

The Love.Live.Life. Tour commenced on 11 April 2011 in the Isle of Wight. A DVD of the tour was released on 22 August 2011. The DVD was recorded during the concert at the O2 Arena on 30 April 2011.

Cancellations and rescheduled shows

Set list
"Took It All Away"
"Strong Again"
"Living for the Moment"
"Playing with Fire"
"I Swear"
"Girls"
"Toot It and Boot It"
"Meet Me Halfway"
"Down"
"My Name Is Tulisa"
"Love Sick"
"Scream My Name"
"Love.Live.Life"
"Morning Star"
"Say It's Over"
"Cold Shoulder"
"So Alive"
"Papa Can You Hear Me?"
"Defeat You"
"Love for My Slums"
"Better Not Waste My Time"
"Ouch"
"Sex"
"Number 1"
"Best Behaviour"

Supporting acts
Starboy Nathan
Professor Green (from 21 April)
Fearless
Encore
Ny

The band
Guitar: Martin 'NMQ' Anderson
Drums: Jonathan 'Ginger' Hamilton
Keyboards: Gavin Powell
Bass: Michael ' Smoove Groove' Hamilton

Charts

Weekly charts

Year-end charts

Certifications

Release history

References

N-Dubz albums
2010 albums
Concept albums
Albums produced by Free School
Albums produced by Jim Jonsin
Albums produced by Salaam Remi
Island Records albums
Albums produced by Mr Hudson